Pirquluoba (also, Pirkulioba and Pirkuluoba) is a village and municipality in the Khachmaz Rayon of Azerbaijan.  It has a population of 2,841.  The municipality consists of the villages of Pirquluoba, Qoçaqqazma, Yeni Sudur, and Hacıməmmədoba.

References 

Populated places in Khachmaz District